VA Medical Center Station can refer to:

VA Medical Center station (DART), a station on the DART Light Rail in Dallas, Texas, USA
VA Medical Center station (MBTA), a former station on the MBTA Green Line in Boston, Massachusetts, USA
VA Medical Center station (Metro Transit), a station on the METRO Blue Line in Minneapolis, Minnesota, USA
VA Medical Center station (San Diego), a station under construction on the San Diego Trolley Blue line in San Diego, California, USA
Heath Street station, a station on the MBTA Green Line announced as "Heath Street/VA Medical Center" in Boston, Massachusetts, USA